Leesburg High School is a public high school located in Leesburg, Florida and is one of seven public high schools in Lake County, Florida. The school is made up of approximately 1,500 students. The current principal is Michael Randolph.

History
Leesburg High School was established in 1926. For 42 years, it served white students only. After the federal government mandated integration, African-American children who had previously attended Carver Heights High School and Lake County Training School were reassigned to Leesburg High School in 1968. Some of the faculty from the black schools were retained, usually with reduced responsibilities. Carver Heights was repurposed as a middle school. Students from Carver Heights were amazed at the facilities and equipment enjoyed by the white students.

Boys basketball
The school won state championships in 1977, 2011, 2016 and 2017.

Postsecondary Academic Opportunities
 Cambridge AICE
 Advanced Placement
 Dual Enrollment (through Lake Sumter State College and the University of Florida)

Programs
 Band (Swarm Of Sound)

Honor Societies
 Beta Club
 Mu Alpha Theta
 National Honors Society
 National Science Honors Society
 National Art Honors Society

Notable alumni
 Roger Holt, Former MLB player (New York Yankees)
 Greg Johnson, NFL player
 Danny Trevathan, NFL player
 Robert S. Singleton, American engineer
 Noor Davis, Former NFL player

References 

Educational institutions in the United States with year of establishment missing
High schools in Lake County, Florida
Public high schools in Florida
Leesburg, Florida